Nadezhda Vinogradova (born May 1, 1958) is a former heptathlete from the Soviet Union, who was born as Nadezhda Miromanova. She set the second official world record in the women's heptathlon, gaining a total number of 6181 points on May 5, 1981 at a meet in Kislovodsk. She won the silver medal (6357 points) in the women's heptathlon at the 1984 Friendship Games.

References
All-Time List
Olympic Boycott Games

1958 births
Living people
Russian heptathletes
Soviet heptathletes
World record setters in athletics (track and field)
Universiade medalists in athletics (track and field)
Place of birth missing (living people)
Universiade silver medalists for the Soviet Union
Medalists at the 1981 Summer Universiade
Friendship Games medalists in athletics